Big Graveling Creek is a  tributary of the Mullica River in southern New Jersey in the United States.

It is a narrow, meandering tidal channel (gut) through the salt marshes of the Edwin B. Forsythe National Wildlife Refuge, connecting the Mullica and Mott Creek.

See also
List of rivers of New Jersey

References

External links
Edwin B. Forsythe National Wildlife Refuge

Tributaries of the Mullica River
Rivers in the Pine Barrens (New Jersey)
Rivers of New Jersey